1985 Hopmann is a dark background asteroid in the outer regions of the asteroid belt. It was discovered on 13 January 1929, by astronomer Karl Reinmuth at Landessternwarte Heidelberg-Königstuhl in southern Germany. It was later named after German astronomer Josef Hopmann (1890–1975).

Orbit and classification 

Hopmann is a dark C-type asteroid that orbits the Sun in the outer main-belt at a distance of 2.6–3.6 AU once every 5 years and 6 months (2,014 days). Its orbit has an eccentricity of 0.15 and an inclination of 17° with respect to the ecliptic. The first observation used for the body's observation arc was taken at the discovering observatory on 4 February 1926, or 22 days after its official discovering observation.

Naming 

This minor planet was named in memory of German astronomer Josef Hopmann (1890–1975), a director of Vienna Observatory between 1951 and 1962, a productive observer of variable and binary stars, and a participant in the international program to observe near-Earth asteroid 433 Eros in the early 1930s. The lunar crater Hopmann is also named in his honour. The official  was published by the Minor Planet Center on 15 October 1977.

Physical characteristics 

According to the survey carried out by the Infrared Astronomical Satellite IRAS, Hopmann measures 35.51 kilometers in diameter. The Collaborative Asteroid Lightcurve Link agrees with the Supplemental IRAS Minor Planet Survey (SIMPS) data and derives an albedo of 0.039 and a diameter of 35.47 kilometers, while observations with NASA's Wide-field Infrared Survey Explorer and its subsequent NEOWISE mission gave an albedo of 0.06 and a diameter of 44.33 kilometers.

In January and February 2012, three rotational lightcurves were obtained by Robert Stephens at Santana Observatory, California, Josep Maria Aymami at Carmelita Observatory, Barcelona, and Patricia Moravec at Oakley Southern Sky Observatory, Australia. The lightcurves gave a well-defined rotation period of 17.476, 17.478 and 17.480 hours, respectively, with a brightness variation between 0.36 and 0.44 magnitude. In 2016, a re-modeled lightcurve, constructed from data compiled in the Lowell Photometric Database, also gave a concurring period.

References

External links 
 Prof. Dr. phil. habil. Josef Hopmann, catalogus professorum (Leipzig University)
 Lightcurve Database Query (LCDB), at www.minorplanet.info
 Dictionary of Minor Planet Names, Google books
 Asteroids and comets rotation curves, CdR – Geneva Observatory, Raoul Behrend
 Discovery Circumstances: Numbered Minor Planets (1)-(5000) – Minor Planet Center
 
 

001985
Discoveries by Karl Wilhelm Reinmuth
Named minor planets
19290113